161st Division or 161st Infantry Division may refer to:

 161st Division (People's Republic of China – 1st Formation), 1948–1949
 161st Infantry Division (France)
 161st Infantry Division (Wehrmacht)
 161st Division (Imperial Japanese Army)